Leonardo Morales may refer to:

 Leonardo Morales (footballer, born 1975), retired Honduran footballer
 Leonardo Morales (footballer, born 1978), Venezuelan football goalkeeper
 Leonardo Morales (footballer, born 1987), Argentine football midfielder
 Leonardo Morales (footballer, born 1991), Argentine football defender
 Leonardo Morales y Pedroso (1887–1965), Cuban architect
 Leonardo Morales Morales